Wrestling at the 2016 Summer Olympics in Rio de Janeiro took place from 14 to 21 August at the Carioca Arena 2 in Barra da Tijuca. Wrestling had been split into two disciplines, freestyle and Greco-Roman, which were further divided into different weight categories. Men competed in both disciplines whereas women only participated in the freestyle events, with 18 gold medals awarded. Wrestling had been contested at every modern Summer Olympic Games, except Paris 1900.

Around 344 wrestlers competed in 18 events at the 2016 Summer Olympics. In September 2013, a new change to the rules and guidelines of the sport had been instituted and overhauled by the International Olympic Committee and FILA (now known as the United World Wrestling). A single Olympic weight class was removed each from the men's freestyle and Greco-Roman wrestling to add two more weights for the women. Other changes in wrestling at these Games also featured a single-round tournament within a six-minute limit, instead of two-round or tiebreaker.

Competition format
38 men or 18 women competed in each division, plus 6 others allocated either to the host country or by the tripartite commission into divisions yet to be determined prior to the Olympics. Wrestlers determined by lot competed in qualification rounds to reduce the number to 16, thereafter proceeding by simple knockout to determine the finalists who competed for gold and silver. The two groups of wrestlers respectively defeated in the 3 or 4 bouts of the two finalists competed in two serial elimination repechages, with the victor in each repechage being awarded bronze. Coaches were given plush dolls of Vinicius, the Olympic mascot, to throw into the ring when they wished to challenge a call.

Competition schedule
There were two sessions of competition on each day of the 2016 Olympics Wrestling program. Except for the last day, the first session (qualification and elimination) was conducted from 10:00 to 13:00 BRT, and the second session (repechage, bronze medal and gold medal) was conducted from 16:00 to 19:00 BRT. Due to the closing ceremony on the last day (21 Aug) in the evening, the timing for the first and second session were 08:30–11:15 and 12:45–15:15 BRT respectively.

Qualification

Medalists

Men's freestyle

Men's Greco-Roman

Women's freestyle

Medal table

Participation

Participating nations

Official referees
This is the official list of referees from 2016 Summer Olympics:

  Antonio Silvestri (Chief of the Refereeing Commission)
  Guillermo Molina (Instructor)
  Edit Dozsa (Instructor)
  Osamu Saito (Instructor)
  Andrey Krikov (Instructor)
  Kamel Mohamed Bouaziz (Instructor)
  Halil İbrahim Cicioğlu (Instructor)
  Zach Errett (Instructor)
  Konstantin Mikhaylov (Instructor)
  Pertti Vehviläinen (Supervisor)
  Régine Legleut (Supervisor)
  Edisher Machaidze (Supervisor)
  Bakhytzhan Jaxykulov (Supervisor)
  Noreddine Mochaffaa (Supervisor)
  Sergey Novakovskiy (Supervisor)

References

External links

 
 
 United World Wrestling
 NBC Olympics: Wrestling
 Results Book – Wrestling

 
2016 Summer Olympics events
2016
2016 in sport wrestling